Streesmutprakan School is a coeducational public high school in Samut Prakan Province, Thailand. 

The school has junior high school and high school levels. In 2011 the school received an award from King Bhumibol Adulyadej and was honoured by the Department of Education as an International Standard Quality School.

History 
On July 18, 1883. Prince Krom Phraya Damrong Rachanupab established the school as a primary school at Wat Klang, Paknam Muang, in Samut Prakarn  In 1900, Chao Phraya Sadej Suren Tara Tippadee made it a high school. 

In 1902, a separate school building was built, becoming the first public school in Smutprakan Province Praya Racha Yusatok established another school building for girls in the temple.

In 1938, Streesmutprakan school moved to a new site, incorporating the girls school from the temple. The  school was opposite Pichai Songkram Temple and had an area of about three hectares. The school taught primary school level 3 to junior high school level 3 by  Krasair RatanaWraha, who established the first two buildings of the school named RuenSangruji and Phinittantakit.

In 1942, Sobsamai Burawas became the principal . On 8 August 1956, the school was moved to the present site. The land was donated by Loung Prajerd Ugsornluk, who gave , and the school bought an additional  with money from the Department of Education. Later on, the school received  from  Srisomboon Sittichai.

References 

Schools in Thailand
Buildings and structures in Samut Prakan province
Education in Samutprakan province